Nebraska state elections in 2020 was held on Tuesday, November 3, 2020. Its primary elections were held on August 18, 2020.

In addition to the U.S. presidential race, Nebraska voters elected the Class II U.S. Senator from Nebraska, 1 of its Public Service Commissioners, 2 of 8 voting members on the Nebraska University Board of Regents, 4 of 8 seats on the Nebraska State Board of Education, all of its seats to the House of Representatives, 2 of 7 seats on the Nebraska Supreme Court, 2 of 6 seats on the Nebraska Court of Appeals and 25 of 49 seats in the unicameral Nebraska Legislature. There are also six ballot measures which have been voted on.

Federal offices

President of the United States

Nebraska has 5 electoral votes in the Electoral College.

United States Class II Senate Seat

United States House of Representatives

All three Republican incumbents are running for reelection.

Public Service Commission
Democratic incumbent Crystal Rhodes is up for re-election to District 2 of Nebraska's Public Service Commission.

University of Nebraska Board of Regents
Timothy Clare is running for reelection in District 1. District 2 is an open seat.

Board of Education
Incumbents Patsy Koch Johns (of District 1) and Lisa Fricke (of District 2) are both running for another term on the Board. Districts 3 and 4 are open seats.

State Judiciary
Two incumbents on the state Supreme Court and two on the state Court of Appeals are running for retention (a six-year term) in 2020.

State Legislature
25 of 49 seats in the Nebraska State Legislature are up for election. Although officially nonpartisan, before the election, its de facto composition was:

Ballot Measures
Nebraska Initiative 428 would cap the annual interest for payday loans at 36%. As of September 2020, the Nebraskan average is 400% APR.

Polling
Vote for 428, an organisation campaigning for the initiative's passage, released a poll by Benenson Group Strategies which showed support for the measure (among Nebraskan voters) at 67%. It was conducted in August. It

References

External links
 

 
Nebraska